Hugh Stevenson Roberton (18 December 1900 – 13 March 1987) was an Australian politician. A member of the Country Party, he served as Minister for Social Services in the Menzies government from 1956 to 1965. He later served as Ambassador to Ireland from 1965 to 1967.

Early life
Roberton was born in Glasgow, Scotland, son of Sir Hugh S. Roberton, a Scottish composer and founder of the Glasgow Orpheus Choir.  He was educated at the West of Scotland Agricultural College and Glasgow University and emigrated to Australia in the 1920s.  He became a farmer and grazier at Old Junee and a writer on political and economic subjects, particularly in the rural newspaper the Land under the name, "Peter Snodgrass".  During World War II he served as a gunner in the Middle East.

Politics
Roberton stood for the Country Party at the 1949 election for the House of Representatives seat of Riverina and defeated the Labor member, Joe Langtry.  He was a proponent of government intervention to stabilise the price paid to wheat-growers.  In February 1956, he was appointed Minister for Social Services in the seventh Menzies Ministry, a position he held until his resignation from parliament in 1965. He was an unsuccessful candidate for the Country Party's deputy leadership in 1963, losing to Charles Adermann after the retirement of Charles Davidson.

Later life
Roberton was appointed Australia's first ambassador to Ireland in 1965 and served until 1967.

Roberton died in Canberra in 1987, aged 86. He was survived by his wife, Eileen, and a daughter.

Notes

 

1900 births
1987 deaths
National Party of Australia members of the Parliament of Australia
Members of the Australian House of Representatives for Riverina
Members of the Australian House of Representatives
Ambassadors of Australia to Ireland
20th-century Australian politicians
Alumni of the University of Glasgow
Scottish emigrants to Australia
Alumni of Scotland's Rural College